Dark Sun (fl. 810), was an ajaw of the Maya city of Tikal. He ruled  810 and was probably the son of Nuun Ujol K'inich. The monuments associated with Dark Sun are: Stela 24; Altar 7; Temple 3 Lintel 2?.

Notes

Footnotes

References
 

Rulers of Tikal
9th century in the Maya civilization
9th-century monarchs in North America
9th century in Guatemala